Williamsburg Area Transit Authority (WATA) is a multi-jurisdiction transportation agency providing transit bus and ADA Paratransit services in the City of Williamsburg, James City County, York County in the Historic Triangle area and Surry County, VA of the Virginia Peninsula subregion of Hampton Roads in southeastern Virginia.

WATA operates 13 bus routes within the city and 2 counties, using a "hub and spoke" designed system using the intermodal Williamsburg Transportation Center and the James City County Walmart as hubs. Additionally, a connection to the City of Newport News and the Hampton Roads Transit (HRT) public transit bus system is provided on Route 1 serving U.S. Route 60 east by traveling into the western edge of Newport News and meeting 2 HRT's Routes at Lee Hall, Virginia.

WATA also operates replica (rubber-tired) Trolley service (Route 14) between the College of William and Mary, High Street in Williamsburg, Virginia and New Town Williamsburg.

History and service area 
Williamsburg Area Transit Authority (WATA) is the successor to James City County Transit (JCCT), and "Williamsburg Area Transport" (WAT). JCCT began in 1977 as a James City County Social Services transportation system using flexible routes to serve those needing it most. The successful service grew into a public bus system serving multiple jurisdictions and the organization became Williamsburg Area Transport which was also governmentally operated by James City County in the community for many years. In the early 21st century, by changing from being known as James City County Transit to the newer name of "Williamsburg Area Transport", the scope and area of the current regional services were more accurately described as part of a new organizational structure authorized by the Virginia General Assembly. In 2008, "Williamsburg Area Transport" grew into the first Virginia "transit authority" branded as "Williamsburg Area Transit Authority".

WATA services are operated within the City of Williamsburg, James City County, the Bruton District of York County and Surry County serving citizens and visitors to all four localities. Historic sites and extensive tourism form the basis for an unusual operating environment in comparison to similar sized localities elsewhere in Virginia and the United States.

James City County and York County are each one of the eight original shires of Virginia formed in 1634, and are two of the oldest counties in Virginia as well as the present United States. The City of Williamsburg, long-located along the border of the two counties, was founded in 1623 as Middle Plantation, initially a fortified community midway across the Virginia Peninsula on high ground. It was selected as the site of the new College of William and Mary, a long-desired effort of the colonists which was established by a Royal Charter issued in 1693 by King William III and Queen Mary II, joint sovereigns of England, Scotland and Ireland. Several years later, partially due a persuasive presentation to the House of Burgesses by the Reverend Dr. James Blair and a group of his students, the tiny community was selected to replace the harsh weather and other environmental conditions at Jamestown and became the capital of the Colony of Virginia in 1698, renamed the following year in honor of King William. Williamsburg became the first chartered city in Virginia in 1722 during colonial times, and became an independent city under a change in Virginia's state constitution in 1871. The first mental health facility in the United States was established at Williamsburg in 1770, and its successor, Eastern State Hospital, a state-owned facility, continues to operate nearby in modern times.

Beginning in 1926, the extensive restoration of a central part of Williamsburg to the era of the pre-American Revolutionary War era of the late 1780s was initially funded and led by John D. Rockefeller Jr. and his wife, Abby Aldrich Rockefeller. Their efforts and generous contributions and those of their descendants and many others resulted in the creation and initial endowment of Colonial Williamsburg. Rather than simply an effort to preserve the antiquity, the combination of extensive restoration and thoughtful recreation of the entire colonial town facilitates envisioning the atmosphere and embracing the ideals of the 18th century patriots. As a tangible birthplace of democracy, Colonial Williamsburg and the surrounding area developed into one of the most popular tourist destinations in the world. Another major historical point of the WATA service area includes Jamestown Settlement.

Additionally, the WATA service area encompasses several prominent museums and other attractions including two major theme parks, hospitality businesses which include dozens of hotels and restaurants, and several shopping outlet complexes. The area has grown popular for resort complexes and as a choice for relocating retirees from other areas. The area also has large U.S. military complexes at Camp Peary, the Yorktown Naval Weapons Station, and is adjacent to the U.S. Army base at Fort Eustis. Rounding out the community are as residential areas, schools, retail and industrial enterprises.

Specific unincorporated communities within the WATA service area generally include:

Croaker
Diascund
Five Forks
Grove
Indigo Park
Jamestown
Kingspoint
Kingsmill (including Busch Gardens Williamsburg)
Lee Hall (just outside counties in Newport News)
Lightfoot
Norge
Toano
Yorktown

Funding 
The services of Williamsburg Area Transit Authority are partially funded through rider fares, a form of user fees. The system is also subsidized by the partner local governments of the City of Williamsburg, James City County, and York County,  as well as purchases of services by the College of William and Mary, Surry County, City of Newport News, Virginia, and Colonial Williamsburg, and other community organizations.

WATA also receives State and Federal financial assistance from the Virginia Department of Rail and Public Transportation (VDRPT) and the Federal Transit Administration (FTA), which is an agency within the U.S. Department of Transportation (DOT).

Route system 
WATA operates what is often called a "hub and spoke" bus routing system. At designated intervals, the transit buses all meet at a coordinated time at a central location or Hub (in this instance the Williamsburg Transportation Center and Walmart), and then serve various outlying areas in many directions.

The "Hub and Spoke" Route System does not include:
 demand responsive paratransit service provided with smaller buses
 Rubber-tired trolley replica buses operated on the short shuttle loops
William and Mary's Route 8 that serves the college campus
 Surry (Route 13) bus service provides pre-scheduled route deviations within 3/4 of a mile from a bus stop.

Williamsburg Transportation Center 
Six routes meet at the Williamsburg Transportation Center at the start of the hour. Located at a restored Chesapeake and Ohio Railway station owned by the City of Williamsburg in downtown Williamsburg, the Transportation Center not only serves WATA's regular routes, but also service:

 Amtrak passenger rail
 Greyhound Lines intercity bus service
 Hampton Roads Transit (Route 121)
 local taxicab and car rental services

WATA route lines 
The WATA system serves eleven bus lines, most are color-coded. All route information is current as of October 2017.

 Route 1: Lee Hall: U.S. Route 60 between Williamsburg Transportation Center and Lee Hall (including Busch Gardens). Also serves Riverside Doctor's Hospital, Grove Community, Windy Hill, James River Commerce Park, Green Mount Industrial Park, and Lee Hall in Newport News, where a connection with Hampton Roads Transit (HRT) service is available.
 Route 2: Richmond: U.S. Route 60 between Williamsburg Transportation Center and the Walmart store in Lightfoot.  Serves as a connector for passengers transferring from or to either Purple Lines.
 Route 8: W & M: Serves the College of William and Mary, Marshall-Wythe School of Law, and the School of Education
 Route 4: Longhill: New Town to Walmart. Also serves Old Towne Medical Center and James City County Human Services Building.
 Route 9: Toano: Storehouse Commerce Park in Toano to Walmart.  Also serves Williamsburg Pottery Factory, Croaker public library, Burnt Ordinary Apartments, and Norge.
 Route 3: Merrimac: Williamsburg Transportation Center to State Route 143 (Merrimack Trail) @ Tam-O-Shanter Blvd (serves Colonial Williamsburg Visitors Center), Capitol Landing Road, Marquis shopping center on State Route 199, and James-York Plaza Shopping Center.
 Route 7: Mooretown: Williamsburg Transportation Center to the Lowe's/Walmart shopping center on East Mooretown Road. This line also serves Sentara Williamsburg Regional Medical Center and Great Wolf Lodge.
 Route 5: Monticello: Williamsburg Transportation Center to Steeplechase Apartments, New Town, Williamsburg-James City County Courthouse complex, Monticello Marketplace shopping center (Target/Martin's grocery store).
 Route 6: Jamestown: Williamsburg Crossing Shopping Center, Colony Square Shopping Center, Jamestown Settlement, John Tyler Hwy, Jamestown Road between Route 199 and Merchants Square, Williamsburg Transportation Center.
 Route 13: Surry: Surry deviated-route bus service
 Route 11: Lackey: Created in July 2017 to service Lackey Clinic, Riverside Hospital, Virginia Peninsula Regional Jail (VPRJ), Naval Weapons Station, and JCC Government Complex. Connects with Route 1 at Riverside Hospital stop.
To help mitigate rush hour traffic and new delays due to heightened security measures on the Jamestown Ferry crossing the James River, in October 2007, WATA began Deviated route transit bus service from 5 stops in Surry County across the James River to limited stops at several major points in James City County and Williamsburg, terminating at the Williamsburg Transportation Center where connections are available with other WATA, HRT, and intercity services. As part of major route and schedule changes, in October 2016 Route 13 would terminate at Jamestown Settlement, where riders could catch Route 6: Jamestown to the Williamsburg Transportation Center.

Surry County stops include Lebanon Apartments, Surry Apartments, Surry Government Center, Surry Community Center, and the VDOT Park and Ride lot near Scotland Wharf. A stop at the Surry branch of the Blackwater Regional Library was added in October 2016.

Route notes 

WATA implemented an intelligent transportation system (ITS), called BusTime for their customers and route management. This ITS (BusTime) system includes a phone and PC optimized web site to find out when the next bus will arrive at any stop, automated alert system based on actual bus location, texting service to determine actual next bus arrival times and text alerts.
 WATA updates their stops and routes on a quarterly basis updating their ITS (BusTime) system and Google Maps.
 Colonial Williamsburg – Many WATA lines serve the Colonial Williamsburg (CW) area.  For service to the CW Visitors Center, riders should use WATA's Route 3: Merrimac route.
 Possible Route 1 confusion – It is notable that Colonial Williamsburg, which operates its own fleet of grey and white colored transit buses and minibuses, also has a "Grey Line" route. This is not to be confused with WATA's Route 1 route for US Route 60 East which ends at Lee Hall. The WATA buses on that route are normally painted beige, white and burgundy in color, and clearly marked for WATA with the words "Williamsburg Area Transit Authority/WATA".
 Yellow Line: WATA dropped this line in Spring 2012, due to overlap with service from Colonial Williamsburg. The line used to run from the Williamsburg Transportation Center to Busch Gardens and Water Country USA. Passengers could catch the shuttle by riding Route 3 to the Colonial Williamsburg Visitor Center.

Fleet 
New Flyer Xcelsior XD40 Diesel
New Flyer XD35 Diesel
Gillig Low Floor 30’, 35’, 40’
Gillig Low Floor BRT 35' Clean Diesel

All buses are equipped with two-way radio communications and on-board ITS system with an emergency alarm. All buses are equipped with surveillance video on the interior and exterior for safety.

Accessibility 
All buses are fully ADA accessible. Also, Paratransit service is provided to eligible individuals not able to use the accessible fixed route bus system.

Operating hours 
WATA bus services operates Monday – Saturday, with reduced service on Sundays. On most James City County holidays, WATA operates on a reduced schedule, with no service on Thanksgiving Day, Christmas Day, and New Years Day.

Williamsburg Trolley 
In May 2008, Williamsburg Area Transit Authority announced that it had recently received a grant for three trolley-replica type buses that will serve the local shopping areas of New Town, High Street, Richmond Road, Jamestown Road, and Merchants Square in Colonial Williamsburg. The Williamsburg Trolley began service in August 2009.  The event was marked with a ribbon-cutting ceremony at New Town. The trolley runs every day except on New Year's Day, Thanksgiving Day, and Christmas Day. Each of the trolley cars feature ornamental wooden seating, a cheerful, two-toned red and blue exterior and bicycle racks. On warm days, the trolley has an open-air atmosphere. Trolley drivers also point out historic sites, restaurants, and must-visit attractions.

Expansion and hub change 
In 2011, WATA expanded its services to include a storefront location in the Williamsburg Outlet Mall on Richmond Road.  The center acts as a hub for public information and waiting areas for passengers, and will eventually include ticket and bus fare sales. This storefront location was moved to the Williamsburg Transportation Center in January 2014 due to the closing of the Outlet Mall.

This change also coincided with the western hub moving to the Lightfoot Walmart store. Routes serving the Outlet Mall were modified to reflect the hub change, as well as extend service further out in Toano.

In January 2015, WATA began a 3-year pilot route in the Jamestown area. The new Route 6:Jamestown route serves Jamestown Road, Jamestown Settlement, Greensprings Road, John Tyler Highway and travels on Rt. 199 back to Jamestown Rd. In October 2016, as a result of major route and schedule changes, Route 6 (Jamestown) added service to the Williamsburg Transportation Center via Jamestown Rd. Service was also discontinued along Greensprings Rd at that time.

Route and schedule overhaul 
In June 2016 WATA proposed several changes to its routes and schedules to improve service. Several hearings were held to solicit public input on the changes.

The proposed changes went into effect in October 2016. Among the schedule changes were the hours of 30-minute frequency service from 6:30am–9:30am and 3:30pm–6:30pm on weekdays. Routes 1 and 2 would also extend their hours to 11pm. Frequency service ended on Route 7: Mooretown route, reverting it to hourly service only.

References

External links 
 Williamsburg Area Transit Authority

Transportation in Williamsburg, Virginia
Transportation in James City County, Virginia
Transportation in York County, Virginia
Bus transportation in Virginia
Transit agencies in Virginia
1977 establishments in Virginia